Walter Boughton Chambers, AIA (September 15, 1866 – April 19, 1945) was a successful New York City architect whose buildings continue to be landmarks in the city’s skyline and whose contributions to architectural education were far-reaching.

Childhood and education

Chambers was born in Brooklyn, New York, the son of attorney William P. Chambers and Caroline Smith Boughton, both of whom were New York natives.  As a child both Walter and his brother, author, Robert William Chambers, attended Brooklyn Polytechnic School, from there he was accepted into the class of 1887 at Yale University,  At Yale he served on the fifteenth editorial board of The Yale Record and was a member of the Scroll and Key Society.

Following his graduation Chambers was unsure of his career path when his brother,Robert,  suggested that he come to Paris to study architecture. In order to convince his parents that Walter doing so was a practical idea he noted Walter's proficiency in drawing buildings. Robert reminded his parents of one particular drawing Walter had made at the age of four. The image was rough picture of their church. Anyone who had been showed the drawing was surprised at the accuracy. [Pencil Points, 1928]  His skeptical father took Walter to see family friend, Richard Morris Hunt, a New York architect to ask him what he thought about Walter pursuing a career in architecture.  Mr Hunt's response?  "That is a splendid idea "(Pencil Points 1928).

 For reasons that are unknown his parents were still uncomfortable with the idea of Walter studying abroad. Caroline, who was in Munich at the time, suggested that instead of going to Paris Walter stay with her and attend the University of Munich. That summer both boys went to Munich and attended classes. Robert to courses in general art, Walter began his study of architecture   One of their professors was Franz Reber  who believed that art should be experienced. He put this theory into practice by taking his students on field trips whenever he was introducing a new concept.[Pencil Point, September 1928]. It is during this time that Robert wrote his first novel, "In the Quarter" which chronicled the life a student in Paris during the late 1800s (New York Times, 1932)  After Munich, both young men went to Paris. Walter entered the Ecole des Beaux Arts, where he studied at the atelier of Paul Blondel, it was here he met his future architectural partner Ernest Flagg (1857-1947), a cousin of Cornelius Vanderbilt II.

Practice in New York

Returning to New York, Chambers had planned on forming a practice with Ernest Flagg and others. However, he was engaged and it was decided that it would best for him to be gainfully employed. He went to work for Richard M. Hunt in the draft room where he worked with "Warrington Lawrence, Frank E Walllis, Anthony Hollond, and E.L. Masqueray." . [Pencil Points September 1928]  His partnership would be with formed with Ernest Flagg in 1894. In 1897 they moved into the Mills Building at 35 Wall Street, where they remained until 1919 when they moved to 111 East 40th Street. Usually, Ernest Flagg is credited with some of the work that emerged from their partnership, including, the Singer Building (the world’s tallest building from 1908-1909), the Corcoran Gallery of Art in Washington, D.C., the Washington State Capitol and the Sheldon Library at St. Paul's School (Concord, New Hampshire).  Both Walter and Ernest Flagg were favorites of the Clark family of Cooperstown, New York

Work attributed to Walter B. Chambers

Partial listing:
 St. Nicholas Skating Rink, 69 West 66th Street, New York – 1896 
 Oliver Gould Jennings home, East 72nd Street, New York City, with Flagg 1897-1898 [WorldCat Walter B Chambers]
 Fire Engine Company No 67 - 514 West 170th Street, New York – 1897
 The Oaks Plantation - Goose Creek, South Carolina - 1897 
 Fire Engine Company No. 33 at 44 Great Jones Street, New York – 1899
 Lawrence Library, Pepperell, Massachusetts - 1901
 Mills House – 1902
 Apartment House - 563 Park Avenue, New York – 1908
 James R. Sheffield Residence (Gloria Vanderbilt Cooper Residence) at 45 East 67th Street, New York - 1913
 Furness House, Whitehall and Pearl Street, New York 1918
 International Mercantile Marine Company Building, 1 Broadway, New York - reconstruction - 1919-1921
 1148 Fifth Avenue, New York (apartment house) - 1920
 2 East 96th Street, New York  (apartment house) - 1922-23
 McClellan Hall, Old Campus, Yale University, New Haven, Connecticut – 1925
 Bingham Hall, Old Campus, Yale University, New Haven, Connecticut – 1928
 135 West 58th Street, New York (apartment house) - 1911
 Lucinda Memorial Chapel, Rockville Connecticut
 Home of Charles P Notman Esq' "Three Waters" Gloucester, MA 
Lawrence Hall, Colgate University  New York
 James C. Colgate Student Union, Colgate University New York - 1937

Atelier Masqueray-Chambers
In 1893, Walter B. Chambers joined with Franco-American architect Emmanuel Louis Masqueray to establish the first atelier for architectural studies in the United States based on the French Ecole des Beaux Arts system. Located at 123 East 23rd Street in New York, the Atelier Masqueray-Chambers helped educate many outstanding architects, including Leonard B. Schultze (architect of The Pierre, Sherry-Netherland and Waldorf Astoria Hotel) and William Van Alen (architect of the Chrysler Building).

Chambers was a member of the New York Chapter of the American Institute of Architects. He resided at 7 West 43rd Street, New York, and died in New York City, aged seventy-eight. His brother Robert W. Chambers, born 1865, was a noted artist, illustrator and writer.

References

1866 births
1945 deaths
People from Brooklyn
Architects from New York City
Yale University alumni
American alumni of the École des Beaux-Arts